Symmons Plains Raceway is a motor racing circuit in Australia, located about  south of Launceston, Tasmania. Since the closure of the Longford circuit in the 1960s it has been Tasmania's premier motor racing facility. The circuit is one of the longest serving circuits of the combined history of the Australian Touring Car Championship and the V8 Supercar Championship Series. Since 2005 it has hosted the Falken Tasmania Challenge for V8 Supercars.

In 2004, the facility received a A$3 million upgrade which included some modifications to the layout of the track, including moving the start/finish line back to a more conventional location opposite the pits. It had previously been on a curve (which is now located just after the first corner), unusual for a road course. Symmons Plains is also known for its extremely tight hairpin bend, known as Brambles Hairpin, at the end of the old front straight.

The circuit 
The banking at the hairpin is a unique opportunity to overtake. The other overtaking opportunity is the left hander at the end of the back straight.

Supercars Championship

The circuit has hosted rounds of the Australian Touring Car Championship and Supercars Championship since 1969. The circuit was left off the V8 Supercar calendar in 2000 before returning in 2004 after the upgrades were completed.

Lap records

From 1980 to 2021, Alfredo Costanzo held the outright race lap record by setting a time of 50.16 seconds with Lola T430 Formula 5000. The closest anyone had come since 1980 was British driver James Winslow who set a time of 50.5036 seconds on 1 April 2012 while driving a Dallara F307. 

Then, that outright lap record was broken in 2021 by driver Joey Mawson. Driving a Ligier JS F3-S5000, the Australian driver set a time of 0:49.7242 seconds. In 2022, the record was improved again by himself, by setting a time of 0:48.5598 seconds.

The 'Tassie Tin Tops' category included below is a combined closed car category not built to any specific set of regulations, it usually runs at major national meetings bringing together a collection of vehicles that usually compete in specific categories at Tasmanian State Championship race meetings, it usually includes Sports Sedans, Improved Production and Sports GT category vehicles.

The official race lap records at Symmons Plains Raceway are listed as:

Notes

References

External links

Symmons Plains at MotorsportTAS.com.au
Map and track history at RacingCircuits.info

Motorsport venues in Tasmania
Sports venues in Tasmania
Supercars Championship circuits
Motorsport in Tasmania